France Business School (fBS) was a French Business School, founded in 2012 by a meanwhile cancelled merger of four French business schools:

l'École supérieure de commerce et management (ESCEM) in Tours, Poitiers and Orléans
l'École supérieure de commerce d'Amiens (ESC Amiens)
l'École supérieure de commerce de Clermont (ESC Clermont)
l'ESC Bretagne Brest

History 

fBS was created in a period of merger between French Business Schools in order to achieve “critical size” at an international level. It was officially announced on 22 May 2012. fBS was finally announced as the merger of 4 pre-existing schools: l’École supérieure de commerce et de management (ESCEM) in Tours-Poitiers-Orléans, l'École supérieure de commerce d'Amiens (ESC Amiens), l'École supérieure de commerce de Clermont (ESC Clermont), l'École supérieure de commerce Bretagne Brest (ESC Bretagne Brest).

Type of recruitment 

At its inception, fBS announced its withdrawal from the existing admission testing procedures (BCE, Ecricome) and introduced a different admission procedure from the traditional competitive entrance examination system by organising recruitment days called Talent Days in about 20 French cities.

This recruitment targets different profiles:
Students in the 2nd year of the preparatory track
Holders of a 2-year undergraduate degree or currently enrolled as a Bachelor student
Students with a 3-year undergraduate degree
Graduates from an administrative or management degree programme
Foreign students, holders of a Bachelor's degree
Atypical profiles (students with “non-linear” backgrounds)

Location 

Other sites have joined the campuses of the founding fBS schools (Amiens, Brest, Clermont-Ferrand, Orléans, Poitiers, Tours):
an associated site: Vannes
sites abroad: Beijing and Shanghai

Notes and references

External links 
Official fBS website

Business schools in France